Khaidavyn Altankhuyag (born 16 October 1946) is a Mongolian boxer. He competed at the 1972 Summer Olympics and the 1976 Summer Olympics. At the 1976 Summer Olympics, he lost to Tsvetan Tsvetkov of Bulgaria.

References

External links

1946 births
Living people
Mongolian male boxers
Olympic boxers of Mongolia
Boxers at the 1972 Summer Olympics
Boxers at the 1976 Summer Olympics
Place of birth missing (living people)
Lightweight boxers
20th-century Mongolian people
21st-century Mongolian people